Elizabeth Ann Symonds  (née Burley; 12 July 1939 – 15 November 2018) was an Australian politician. She was a Labor member of the New South Wales Legislative Council from 1982 to 1998.

Biography
Born in Murwillumbah, Ann Burley trained as a teacher at Armidale Teacher's College and the University of New South Wales. On 16 January 1965 she married Maurice Symonds, with whom she had five children. She joined the Labor Party in 1967. In 1974 she was elected to Waverley Municipal Council, becoming the municipality's first female Deputy Mayor in 1977.

In 1982, Symonds was appointed to the New South Wales Legislative Council as a Labor member following the resignation of Peter Baldwin, who was contesting the federal seat of Sydney in the upcoming federal election. She held her seat until 1998, when she resigned; the subsequent vacancy was filled by Carmel Tebbutt.

She was a founder of the Australian Parliamentary Group on Drug Law Reform (APGDLR), a cross party group of 100 MPs from State and Commonwealth parliaments. The group was set up in 1993 after a meeting in Canberra convened by Symonds and Michael Moore (ACT Assembly).

Symonds was Patron of SHINE for Kids, a charity supporting children which family members in the criminal justice system, from 1999 until her death.

Symonds died in St Vincent's Private Hospital, Darlinghurst, on 15 November 2018 after a long illness. The notice of her death ended with the epithet, "Well-behaved women rarely make history".

References

1939 births
2018 deaths
Members of the New South Wales Legislative Council
Members of the Order of Australia
University of New South Wales alumni
Australian Labor Party members of the Parliament of New South Wales
Women members of the New South Wales Legislative Council